Owen Damm (born August 22, 2003) is an American professional soccer player who plays as a defender for USL Championship club Louisville City.

Club career

Youth
Damm attended Woodford County High School where he played high school and three times made all-state lists, including a first team spot in 2020, and helped his school to a trio of district titles from 2019 to 2021.

In February 2021, Damm signed a USL academy contract with USL Championship side Louisville City, which allowed him to retain his NCAA eligibility.

Professional
On December 21, 2021, it was announced that Damm had signed a professional deal with Louisville City, which included a scholarship at Bellevue University.

On April 6, 2022, Damm was loaned to USL League One's ahead of their inaugural season.  He made his professional debut the same day, appearing as a half-time substitute in a Lamar Hunt U.S. Open Cup game against Colorado Springs Switchbacks.

References

2003 births
Living people
American soccer players
Association football defenders
Louisville City FC players
Northern Colorado Hailstorm FC players
People from Versailles, Kentucky
Soccer players from Kentucky
USL League One players